is Japanese film director, graphic artist, and manga author.

Career 

Yamada started his artistic career by working at Shuji Terayama's theatre company, Tenjousajiki.  In 1974, he was appointed as  an artistic crew in Terayama's feature-film, Denen ni Shisu (Pastoral: To Die in the Country). He also worked for Boxer (1977), Kusameikyu (Grass Labyrinth, 1979),  Saraba Hakobune (Farewell to the Ark, 1982).

At the same time in Sapporo, Yamada started a film club, Gingagahou-sha Eiga Club, with his colleague Yumekichi Minatoya in 1977. Ever since his first 8mm film made for the club,  Subaru no Yoru (An Incident of Night) was selected for Pia Film Festival, he has been constantly working with 8mm films (occasionally 16mm).  Most of them are short 'private films' and named by himself 'Yamavicascope'. Since 1991, La Camera in Tokyo has produced regular duo-screenings of his films and the works by  Yamazaki Mikio. In the filmography of Yamavicascope, the film-correspondences between Yamada and Yamazaki are titled as OUFUKU (Film Letter) I~V (1986~2006).  In addition to screenings in Japan,  Yamada's experimental art works have been featured at Cannes, Oberhausen, Stockholm and other film festivals. His feature-films are Anmonaito no sasayaki wo kiita (I've heard the ammonite's murmur:1992), Jouhatsu Tabinikki (The Soul Odyssey: 2003) based on the essay by Yoshiharu Tsuge, and Shutorumu unto Doranku (Sturm und Drang: 2014).

In addition to the cinema work, Yamada works with the media of manga, painting and graphic design. His calligraphic font has been appointed for a number of publications and advertisement posters.

Film works  
There are more than one hundred oeuvres, The following is only a selected list and excludes the feature-films mentioned above.

1977　  An incident of night, 25min, colour, 8mm  (selected for Pia Film Festival)
1978　 Night Window, 20min, colour, 8mm 
1980　 A marine barber, 25min, colour, 8mm 
1981　 Way home, 25min, colour,  8mm  (selected for The Berlin International Film Festival)
1982　 Night of the Milky Way Railroad, 45min, colour, 8mm 
1983　 The fan of spiral shell, 12min, colour, 16mm 
1984　 Sad Gadolf, 20min, colour, 16mm  
1985　 All Alone, 10min, colour, 8mm   
1986　 A lion and violet, 65min, colour, 8mm (shot in USA)
1987　 HINA, 3min, colour, 8mm  
1988　The sketch of snow, 25min, colour, 8mm
1989　FLAMME, 9min, colour, 8mm
1990　The crown of dreams, 16min, colour, 16mm 
1991　Recollect, 17min, colour, 8mm
1992   Tokyo dusk, 33min, colour, 16mm
1993　A moment before both eyes memorize a phenomenon, 48min, colour, 8mm  
1994   Tears of socks, 9min, colour, 8mm 
1995   The descendant of androgynous, 25min, colour, 8mm  
1996 　Fragmentation of night, 12min, B&W, 16　
1997　Long good-bye, 32min, Ｂ＆Ｗ, 16mm 
1998　I have been looking at the dream continuously., 20min, colour, 8mm
1999　Lemon, 12min, colour, 8mm
2000　Moon globe, 28min, colour, 35mm  ( selected and bought by the 46th International Short Film Festival Oberhausen)    
2001　PUZZLE, 20min, B&W, 8mm,  The sun which shone like a pearl, 15min, colour, 8mm  (shot in France)
2002　Every day, 50min, colour, 8mm 
2003   Suspicious alley, 22min, colour, 8mm 
2004   Germany:maiglöckchen, 30min, B&W and colour, 8mm (shot in Germany), The north glimmer, 30min, colour, 8mm (shot in Sweden)
2005   Skelton in the boy's arms, 48min, colour, 8mm
2006   Fragilitat, 25min, colour, 8mm   ( selected for the 52nd International Short Film Festival Oberhausen)      　　　
2007   Delicate eyelashes, 36min, B&W, 8mm (music by Simon Fisher Turner)
2008   Chocolate, 20min, colour, 8mm           
2009   Tokyo Nostalgia, 32min, B&W, 8mm
2010  Winterreise (Winter Journey), 38min, B&W and colour, 8mm
2011  Despair arabesque, 34min, colour, 8mm
2012   Instant memory, 34min, colour, 8mm         
2013   Looking for my vision, 32min, B&W and colour, 8mm
2014   Kioku (Reflection), 23min, B&W, 8mm (selected and bought by the 61st International Short Film Festival Oberhausen) 
2015   Mosaïque en blanc, 35min, B&W and colour, 8mm
2016   Strasse - transient passage, 40min, B&W and colour, 8mm 
2017   Apparition's Moment, B&W, 8mm 
        G.S. Sirius, B&W and colour, 8mm

Art works  
 Koutou Yakyoku - Aishuu no machi ni hoshi ga furu - Momoiro Tsukiyo hen (Red Gaslight Serenade - Stars falling down over the nostalgic Town  ), 1975
 Aka Uogashi (Red Fish Riverside), 1976 
 Hinata no Nioi (The Fragrance of Sunny Side, 1992
 Ukiyo (Floating World), 1994
 Tawamuro (À la folie), 1995
 Utsubuse (Sur le ventre), 1998 
 Itazura (Mischief), 2000
 Michi kusa, 2001
 Midori kame (Green Turtle), 2005
 Fuyu no neko no nakigoe  (The Creeping of A Winter Cat), 2007
 Dandizumu no namida (Tears of Dandyism), 2008 
 Ningyo (Sirène), 2009
 Moeru youna orengi iro no senkou de kakomareta aoi yokogao (A blue profile outlined by the burning orange dim light), 2010
 Watashi no Aoi Touno nakani Darega iruno  (There is someone in my blue tower), 2011
 Gozen sanjini rousoku no higa aozameru (The candle light turning blue at 3:00 am ), 2013

See also 

 Shuji Terayama
 Tenjō Sajiki
 Akira Uno
 Yoshiharu Tsuge
 Morio Agata
 Tengai Amano
 Simon Fisher Turner
 International Short Film Festival Oberhausen
 Cannes Film Festival

References 
 YAMADA ISAO Yumeno fiirudo (Isao Yamada The Filed of Dreams)　Image Garireo, Tokyo, 1990
  Hoshi no Fragmento - Yamada Isao no Ashioto (Fragmentation of Star - ) Kobe Art Village Centre ed., Waizu publishing, Tokyo, 2003
  The Cosmology OF ISAO YAMADA II, YHI Ylva Salon ed., Tokyo & Stockholm, Kougeisha, Tokushima, 2015

External links 
 website
 Stockholm Film Festival
 und Drang
 

Japanese film directors
1952 births
Living people